Florenz may refer to:
 Florenz Regalado (born 1928), Associate Justice of the Supreme Court of the Philippines
 Florenz Ziegfeld (1867–1932), American Broadway impresario
 Karl-Heinz Florenz (born 1947), German Member of the European Parliament
 The German name for Florence, Italy

See also
 Florence (disambiguation)